Ragland is a town in St. Clair County, Alabama, United States southeast of Ashville. It incorporated in 1899. At the 2010 census the population was 1,639, down from 1,918 in 2000. It is part of the Birmingham-Hoover-Cullman Combined Statistical Area.

1994 Tornado
An F4 tornado struck from the southwest on Palm Sunday, March 27, 1994 at 10:55 a.m. At 11:27 a.m., the National Weather Service of Birmingham issued a tornado warning for northern Calhoun, southeastern Etowah, and southern Cherokee counties. Twelve minutes later, the tornado destroyed Piedmont's Goshen United Methodist Church.

Geography
Ragland is located at  (33.743415, -86.142268).

Demographics

2000 census
As of the census of 2000, there were 1,918 people, 729 households, and 567 families living in the town. The racial makeup of the town was 82.17% White, 17.00% Black or African American, 0.05% Native American, 0.05% Asian, 0.10% from other races, and 0.63% from two or more races.

There were 729 households, out of which 36.4% had children under the age of 18 living with them, 56.9% were married couples living together, 15.8% had a female householder with no husband present, and 22.2% were non-families. 21.0% of all households were made up of individuals, and 11.4% had someone living alone who was 65 years of age or older. The average household size was 2.63 and the average family size was 3.00.

In the town, the age distribution of the population shows 26.2% under the age of 18, 9.7% from 18 to 24, 28.6% from 25 to 44, 21.4% from 45 to 64, and 14.2% who were 65 years of age or older. The median age was 36 years. For every 100 females, there were 90.7 males. For every 100 females age 18 and over, there were 82.9 males.

The median income for a household in the town was $30,152, and the median income for a family was $36,034. Males had a median income of $27,468 versus $21,250 for females. The per capita income for the town was $12,531. About 15.3% of families and 18.8% of the population were below the poverty line, including 22.3% of those under age 18 and 21.2% of those age 65 or over.

2010 census
As of the census of 2010, there were 1,639 people, 648 households, and 467 families living in the town. The racial makeup of the town was 82.8% White, 15.4% Black or African American, 0.1% Native American, 0.1% Asian, 0.8% from other races, and 0.9% from two or more races.

There were 648 households, out of which 27.0% had children under the age of 18 living with them, 52.3% were married couples living together, 15.1% had a female householder with no husband present, and 27.9% were non-families. 25.8% of all households were made up of individuals, and 12.8% had someone living alone who was 65 years of age or older. The average household size was 2.53 and the average family size was 3.02.

In the town, the age distribution of the population shows 22.5% under the age of 18, 11.0% from 18 to 24, 23.0% from 25 to 44, 27.6% from 45 to 64, and 15.8% who were 65 years of age or older. The median age was 40.1 years. For every 100 females, there were 91.5 males. For every 100 females age 18 and over, there were 98.2 males.

The median income for a household in the town was $32,292, and the median income for a family was $46,705. Males had a median income of $52,593 versus $26,901 for females. The per capita income for the town was $16,690. About 15.5% of families and 21.1% of the population were below the poverty line, including 30.5% of those under age 18 and 10.1% of those age 65 or over.

2020 census

As of the 2020 United States census, there were 1,693 people, 674 households, and 453 families residing in the town.

Education
St. Clair County School System
http://www.sccboe.org
Ragland School
http://rhs.sccboe.org
Principal: Jennifer B. Ball
Counselor: Mary Jane McCullars
Mascot: Devil
 Colors: Purple and Old Gold

Notable people
Malcolm Laney, former coach for the University of Alabama basketball, golf, and football team and former head coach of Woodlawn High School
Mary Ann Sampson, artist
Ray Treadaway, Major League Baseball player for the Washington Senators
Rudy York, native of Ragland, Major League Baseball player

References

Towns in St. Clair County, Alabama
Towns in Alabama
Birmingham metropolitan area, Alabama